Hudson High School is a Pasco County public school in Hudson, Florida established in 1973.  It is located between Northwest Elementary and Hudson Middle.

Hudson’s feeder schools include Hudson Primary Academy, Shady Hills Elementary, Mary Giella Elementary, Hudson Academy, and Crews Lake Middle.

References

High schools in Pasco County, Florida
Public high schools in Florida
Educational institutions established in 1973